Sinker may refer to:

People:
 George Sinker (1900–1986), MA,  Bishop of Nagpur and Provost of Birmingham Cathedral
 John Sinker (1874–1936), MA, an Anglican priest and author

Other uses:
 Sinker (fishing), a weight used in fishing
 Sinker (baseball), a type of baseball pitch
 Sinker (mining), a person who is employed to sink new shafts
 Sinker, a character in Beyond the Black Stump, an Australian comic strip
 Sinker nail, commonly used in wood-frame construction
 Sinker root, an enlarged, somewhat straight to tapering plant root that grows vertically downward

See also